30-solagii istiqlol (before 30 May 2022 Miskinobod) is a town (before 2022 jamoat and village) in Tajikistan. It is located in Fayzobod District, one of the Districts of Republican Subordination. The jamoat has a total population of 17,749 (2015).

References

Populated places in Districts of Republican Subordination
Jamoats of Tajikistan